Kennesaw State University (KSU) is a public research university in the state of Georgia with two campuses in the Atlanta metropolitan area, one in Kennesaw and the other in Marietta on a combined  of land. The school was founded in 1963 by the Georgia Board of Regents using local bonds and a federal space-grant during a time of major Georgia economic expansion after World War II. KSU also holds classes at the Cobb Galleria Centre, Dalton State College, and in Paulding County (Dallas). The total enrollment exceeds 43,000 students making KSU the second-largest university by enrollment in Georgia while also having the largest freshman class in the state as well.
 
KSU is part of the University System of Georgia and is classified among "R2: Doctoral Universities – High research activity".  The university has academic programs in business, education, engineering, nursing, physical sciences, information technology, criminal justice, and sports management. Kennesaw State's athletic teams are an NCAA Division I member of the ASUN Conference. They will join Conference USA in 2024.

History

Establishment in 1963 until 1975
KSU was chartered by the Board of Regents on October 9, 1963, during one of the most dramatic periods of college expansion in Georgia’s history. The university was officially founded by the Georgia Board of Regents approved the establishment of a junior college tentatively to be named Cobb County Junior College. In December 1964, Horace Sturgis was designated to serve as the future college's first president. When the school opened in fall of 1966, it was named Kennesaw Junior College and had an initial enrollment of 1,014 students.

Early years as Kennesaw College 1976-1995
Thirteen years later, in 1976, the former Kennesaw Junior College became a four-year college and was redesignated Kennesaw College. Betty Siegel became the second president of Kennesaw College in 1981, and the first female university president in the University System of Georgia.

By 1985, KSU had initiated its first graduate degree programs, in business and education, and began a period of rapid growth, including building some residential housing.  Finally, in 1988, the former Kennesaw College was renamed Kennesaw State College and associate degrees were discontinued, except in nursing.

Becoming a major university
Kennesaw State finally achieved University status in 1996. The Kennesaw State's baseball and softball teams won the NCAA Division II national championships in 1996. The winning Owls continued excelling in athletics, including the Lady Owls 2003 win of the NCAA Women's Division II Soccer Championship and the men's basketball team win of the 2004 NCAA Men's Division II Basketball Championship. In part due to their winning Division II in 2005, the Owls joined Division I and the Atlantic Sun Conference.

In 2004, KSU was recognized by the Department of Homeland Security and the National Security Agency as a National Center of Academic Excellence in Information Assurance Education. At the time, this placed KSU among 67 other institutions recognized as CAE/IAEs with this recognition. KSU was recognized again in 2007.

In the summer of 2006, Daniel S. Papp became the university's third president.

KSU also began its first doctoral programs in Education in Leadership for Learning, Education, and a doctorate of Business Administration.

On November 1, 2013, the University System of Georgia announced that Kennesaw State University would merge with nearby Southern Polytechnic State University in 2015. Kennesaw State would be the surviving institution, with President Papp serving as president of the merged university. Southern Polytechnic was started by the president of the Georgia Institute of Technology, Blake R. Van Leer who was known for making Atlanta the "MIT of the South." On January 6, 2015, the Georgia Board of Regents of the University System of Georgia approved the consolidation of Southern Polytechnic State and Kennesaw State. In honor of SPSU's legacy, Kennesaw State established Southern Polytechnic College of Engineering and Engineering Technology as one of its 11 colleges.

In addition, on January 1, 2015, Kennesaw State University was classified by the Carnegie Foundation for Teaching and Learning as a Community Engaged Institution.

Papp announced his retirement on May 10, 2016, and the University System of Georgia's Chief Academic Officer, Houston Davis, was named interim president, effective July 1, 2016. In September 2016, information leaked from University System of Georgia sources indicated that Georgia state attorney general Sam Olens would likely be named the next university president. The potential appointment of Olens, a Republican who litigated Georgia's stance on same-sex marriage, was seen as controversial by some students and faculty, resulting in organized protests. On October 3, 2016, the University System of Georgia Chancellor Hank Huckaby notified the KSU community of Olens' official request for appointment to the job via an email to all students and faculty. The following day, Olens officially interviewed for the job, with an executive board vote expected October 12, 2016. On October 12, 2016, the University System of Georgia announced publicly that Olens was appointed to the office of President of Kennesaw State University, effective November 1, 2016. He will resign as attorney general, and his successor will be appointed by Governor Nathan Deal.
On December 14, 2017, Sam Olens announced that he would be stepping down as president, effective February 18, 2018. Pamela Whitten was announced as KSU's President on July 16, 2018. Whitten stepped down as president of Kennesaw State University in 2021 and accepted the position of president of Indiana University, effective July 1, 2021.

KSU's Computer Science and Information Systems department hosts the Center for Election Systems, which certified and monitored the direct recording electronic machines used in Georgia elections until June 2018 at the latest. This shift was initiated due in part to lax security by the center, which had accidentally exposed over 6.5 million voter records.

On December 19, 2018, KSU was classified as a doctoral research institution with R2 status, denoting high research activity.

On March 16, 2022 Kathy "Kat" Schwaig was named the sixth president of Kennesaw State University, following her tenure as interim president.

Campuses 
Kennesaw State University is located on two campuses with a combined  of land, of which about 230 acres is located in Marietta and the remainder is located in Kennesaw. The Kennesaw campus is located adjacent to I-75 (similar to four other Georgia universities, Georgia Tech, Dalton State College, and Georgia State University, and Atlanta Metropolitan State College) where views of the campus can be seen from the highway, including Kennesaw State's University Village.

Kennesaw Campus

Social Sciences Building

The Social Sciences building is located on the west section of campus on Campus Loop Road adjacent to the original campus historical district. The  building features a 302-seat auditorium, a 100+ seat cinema classroom, a digital media lab, and 40 classrooms with advanced technology. The lobby features a Starbucks and study area. The Social Sciences building also meets Silver Rating LEED Green Building requirements and is the first building in the University System of Georgia to meet these specifications. In December 2020, after the donation of a $9 million dollar gift to the school by Norman and Lindy Radow, the College of Humanities and Social Sciences was renamed the Norman J. Radow College of Humanities and Social Sciences.

Spaceship Earth

Located adjacent to the Social Sciences Building is a  sculpture entitled "Spaceship Earth", created by Finnish American artist Eino. The sculpture was commissioned by the Maxwell Family Foundation in memory of the late environmentalist David Brower. The sculpture was intended to be a permanent reminder to future generations to take care of their delicate planet.

In late December 2006, only three months after installation on campus, the structure collapsed. After the collapse, Eino attributed the disaster to vandalism, but later reports that surfaced associated the collapse with poor construction. Reconstruction was to have begun in February 2007, but was delayed until July 2007, and was finally completed on October 26, 2010.

A. L. Burruss Building

The A. L. Burruss Building is home to the Michael J. Coles College of Business. It is situated in the east section of campus overlooking the Campus Green. The ground floor contains a food court with table seating for eating and studying surrounded by numerous lecture halls. The fourth floor of the Burruss Building is a computer lab open to students and one of the campus data centers. At night, the tower that extends from the center of the Burruss Building facade lights up with the letters "KSU". A sidewalk west of the Burruss building leads north to university housing communities University Village and KSU Place. Access to the arts district northwest of the Burruss Building (Stillwell Theatre, Performance Hall) is offered from the west exit of the Burruss Building.

Campus Green
The Campus Green is a grass area in the center of campus. It offers students an area to relax, study, or throw a football or flying disc between classes. During the spring and fall, student activity on the green can be seen during the noon and afternoon hours. During graduation ceremonies, the Campus Green is no longer used as a reception area. Signs from the east parking deck lead students and visitors to the Campus Green surrounded by the towering buildings in the area (Burruss Building, Kennesaw Hall, and the Student Recreation and Wellness Center) which offer a unique atmosphere on this suburban campus. The Campus Green offers direct access to Kennesaw State's James V. Carmichael Student Center.

Kennesaw Hall

Kennesaw Hall is home to the Bagwell College of Education and administrative offices of the university. The Office of the President resides on the top floor of the building that can be seen from Barrett Parkway (a busy Kennesaw road a few miles away) and Kennesaw Mountain. Kennesaw Hall overlooks the Campus Green and is one of the largest buildings in the east section of campus.

Convocation Center

The Convocation Center is located southeast of the Campus Green and houses the NCAA Division I men's and women's basketball programs at Kennesaw State University. The Convocation Center is a multipurpose facility that supports academic classes, lectures, concerts, theatrical performances, athletic events, graduations, and convocation ceremonies. The facility has locker rooms, training rooms, and offices for the athletic department. The third floor of the center houses hospitality and conference suits that overlook the arena floor. KSU's Convocation Center is the largest of its kind in northwest Georgia, with seating for 4,800.

Bentley Rare Book Gallery
The Bentley Rare Book Gallery and Special Collections, named in honor of Fred and Sara Bentley, brings together a world-class collection of 15,000 items that spans the history of the written word in the Western World. This collection provides undergraduate students the opportunity to study original works firsthand. Recent additions to this collection include a fourth-folio Shakespeare dated 1685b and a first-edition complete works of Chaucer dated 1542. Located on the basement floor of KSU's Sturgis Library, the Rare Book Gallery can be reserved for classroom visits, meetings, and presentations, and is open for research by appointment.

Dr. Bobbie Bailey and Family Performance Center
The Bailey Performance Center opened its doors in October 2007. The $9 million facility contains a 630-seat auditorium designed to accommodate a variety of performance ensembles, the Gwendolyn Brooker Rehearsal Hall, and the Don Russell Clayton Gallery. While serving as the heart of Kennesaw State's Bailey School of Music, the center hosts rehearsals, masterclasses, recording sessions, and recitals for the music faculty and students.

Other selected buildings

The historic district of the university (Original Campus) is located in the west section of campus and includes the University College, formerly the Social Sciences Building, Pilcher Public Service and Library, Willingham Hall, Nursing, Advancement, and Technology Annex buildings. These buildings served primarily as the home to the College of Humanities and Social Science until construction on the Social Science Building was completed at the end of 2006. In 2009, a new two-story, 1,500-seat dining hall known as The Commons opened. In 2008, a new $46,000,000, 915-bed freshman residence hall called "University Suites" opened.

Marietta Campus

Joe Mack Wilson Student Center (A Building)
The Joe Mack Wilson Student Center is located near the front entrance on the northern side of campus. It includes resources such as a University bookstore, a game room, eateries, various lounge areas, and many of KSU's departments and offices.

Administration Building (B Building)
The Administration Building once housed the administrative offices of SPSU, including admissions, student records, recruitment, public relations, and the president's office. The building now houses the Marietta locations of some of KSU's administrative offices, including enrollment services.

Academic Building (H Building)

The main floor of the Academic Building has a major auditorium, some physics labs, and a walk-up help desk. It houses the facilities of the Construction Management Department and the Marietta campus location of University Information Technology Services. The building is near the center of the campus — just south of the Lawrence V. Johnson Library and northwest of the Atrium Building.

Design II (I2 Building)
The Design II building was completed December 2010 and houses facilities of the Architecture program. Acting as an extension of Design I, Design II houses six large studio spaces and a 286-seat auditorium.

Atrium (J Building)

The Atrium Building's name refers to the large atrium that lies in its center. The building houses multiple academic departments. The first floor consists mainly of classrooms; computer laboratories are on the second floor, and faculty offices and conference rooms are on the third floor. It is located near the center of the campus — just west of Howell Hall and southeast of the Academic Building.

Engineering Technology Center (Q Building)
On January 24, 2008, Governor Sonny Perdue recommended a little over $33 million toward the construction of a new building to house five programs: Electrical Engineering Technology, Computer Engineering Technology, Telecommunications Engineering Technology, Mechanical Engineering Technology, and Mechatronics Engineering. It was completed in December 2010; it opened on the first day of classes for the spring semester of 2011. It is on the western side of the campus – north of the parking deck and Stingers Restaurant.

Stingers Restaurant (X Building)
Stingers replaced the established dining hall when it was completed in July 2010. The name references the former SPSU mascot, the Hornets. The upper level dining area supports a commercial food service and the lower level is designed to accommodate special events for the college and its administration. The building is on the western side of the campus, south of the parking deck and the Engineering Technology Center.

Student housing
Dormitory facilities were provided at Southern Tech's first location in Chamblee, Georgia. They were created from former bachelor officers' quarters in facilities leased from the Atlanta Naval Air Station. When the campus moved in Marietta, student accommodation was located in former employee housing  at the United States Air Force Plant 6. Construction for the Marietta campus' first dormitory began in 1964. The campus dormitories housed only men until 1974.

At the time of its merger with Kennesaw State University, Southern Polytechnic State University had five on-campus housing facilities for its students. These were Howell Hall, Hornet Village suites, University Commons apartments, University Courtyard apartments, and University Columns houses. These facilities are still used to house Kennesaw State University students.

Other selected buildings

Other buildings include the Lawrence V. Johnson Library (C Building), Mathematics Building (D Building), Crawford Lab Building (E Building), Engineering Lab Building (G Building), Civil Engineering Technology Building (L Building), W. Clair Harris Textile Center (M Building), Architecture Building (N Building), Housing Office (R10 Building), Recreation and Wellness Center (S1 Building), and Gymnasium (S2 Building).

Academics 

Kennesaw State University is accredited by the Southern Association of Colleges and Schools and classified as a comprehensive institution by the University System of Georgia.

In September 2016, U.S. News elevated KSU from the category of "regional university" to "national university", joining a list of 297 other universities in that category. This was in part due to the university's new status as a research university by the Carnegie Classification of Institutions of Higher Learning, indicating a university that engages in a "moderate" level of research activity.

In 2018, the Carnegie Classification of Institutions of Higher Learning classified KSU as a doctoral research institution with R2 (Doctoral University – High research activity) status.

The 2020 U.S. News rankings placed KSU in Tier Two (#293-#381) in the "National Universities" category.

Colleges and degrees 
The university is divided into 13 colleges and offers 52 bachelor's degrees, 21 master's degree programs, one specialist degree, and five doctoral programs; according to Kennesaw State's Registrar's Office, the university offers 80 undergraduate and graduate degrees.

 College of the Arts
 Coles College of Business
 University College
 College of Science and Mathematics
 Bagwell College of Education
 Wellstar College of Health and Human Services
 Norman J. Radow College of Humanities and Social Sciences
 Graduate College
 Southern Polytechnic College of Engineering and Engineering Technology
 College of Computing and Software Engineering
 College of Continuing and Professional Education
 College of Architecture and Construction Management
 Honors College

Continuing Education 
Kennesaw State's Department of Continuing Education, the largest in the nation, is housed in the KSU Center, located a mile away from the main campus.

Kennesaw State is home to the state's largest Educational Technology Training Center (ETTC). The ETTC is one of 13 such centers around the state. Teachers and other school personnel from around the state come to the KSU ETTC for professional development.

Research 
There are four main focal point themes of research that Kennesaw State focuses its research activity on including: Biomedical and Health; Computing and Technology, Human development & Well-being; and Sustainable and Safe Communities.

Student life

Student groups 
KSU has approximately 300 registered student groups and organizations for student participation. Some of the more active organizations in recent years have been fraternity & sorority life, faith-based and spiritual organizations, and club sports. Many of these groups may apply for funding from the Student Activities and Budget Advisory Committee (SABAC), which is a student-run advisory committee to the vice president of student affairs. This committee meets regularly during the fall and spring semesters.

Student media 
 The Sentinel (KSU) is the official newspaper for KSU. It is printed weekly during fall and spring semesters and twice during the summer semester.
 The Peak is the feature magazine for Kennesaw State University.
 Owl Radio is the student-run online radio station for KSU. Content is streamed online with SHOUTcast and available on the Radio FX mobile application.
 Talisman is the name of the former student yearbook for KSU.

Student demographics
In fall 2021, KSU was 49% male and 51% female.  The ethnic diversity was as follows: 48% White, 25% African-American/Black, 13% Hispanic/Latino, 6% Asian, 5% Multi-Racial, and 2% Other.

Fraternities and sororities 
Kennesaw State University is home to twenty-one fraternities and sororities: twelve of the North American Interfraternity Conference (IFC), eight of the National Panhellenic Conference (NPC), nine of the National Pan-Hellenic Council (NPHC), eight of the National Multicultural Greek Council (MGC) and two service Greeks. Less than seven percent of the undergraduate student body is active in KSU's Greek system.

IFC 
 Beta Upsilon Chi
 Beta Theta Pi
 Sigma Alpha Epsilon
 Sigma Nu
 Sigma Pi
 Delta Chi
 Delta Sigma Phi
 Kappa Alpha Order 
 Pi Kappa Phi
 Theta Chi
 Tau Kappa Epsilon
 Alpha Tau Omega

NPHC 
 Alpha Kappa Alpha sorority
 Alpha Phi Alpha fraternity
 Delta Sigma Theta sorority
 Iota Phi Theta fraternity
 Kappa Alpha Psi fraternity
 Omega Psi Phi fraternity
 Phi Beta Sigma fraternity
 Sigma Gamma Rho sorority
 Zeta Phi Beta sorority

Panhellenic Association 
 Alpha Delta Chi
 Alpha Omicron Pi
 Alpha Xi Delta
 Delta Phi Epsilon
 Gamma Phi Beta
 Kappa Delta
 Phi Mu
 Zeta Tau Alpha

MGC 
 Delta Phi Lambda sorority
 Lambda Theta Alpha sorority
 Lambda Theta Phi fraternity
 Lambda Upsilon Lambda fraternity
 Omega Delta Phi fraternity
 Phi Iota Alpha fraternity
 Sigma Beta Rho fraternity
 Sigma Lambda Upsilon sorority

Service organizations 
 Alpha Phi Omega fraternity
 Omega Phi Alpha sorority

Athletics 

Kennesaw State University's athletic teams are called the Owls. The school colors are black and gold.

The Owls participate in Division I of the NCAA and the ASUN Conference.  Athletics began in the 1981-82 academic year, with KSU joining both the National Association of Intercollegiate Athletics (NAIA) and the Georgia Intercollegiate Athletic Conference (GIAC).  James "Spec" Landrum was named the school's first Athletic Director, after football coaching stints at both Georgia and Georgia Tech.  Success in initiating a new program, particularly in men's golf and women's basketball, highlighted Landrum's tenure.  After Division I's Gulf Star Conference dissolved in 1987, Commissioner Dave Waples replaced the retiring Landrum that fall.  The school won its initial National title in 1994, as coach Mike Sansing's baseball team won the NAIA championship.  In the fall of 1994, KSU officially joined the NCAA, Division II, Peach Belt Conference.  The Owls dominated the loop for the next 11-years, including DII National crowns in softball (1995 and 1996, coach Scott Whitlock), baseball (1996, coach Sansing), women's soccer (2003, coach Rob King) and men's basketball (2004, coach Tony Ingle).  Kennesaw State is one of two division II schools to win a national championship in four different team sports, Grand Valley State University being the other. KSU also won several other regional and divisional championships. Both men's and women's cross-country coach Stan Sims and women's basketball coach Colby Tilley made numerous appearance in NCAA, DII, National competition.

In 2005, the Owls began the painful four-year transition to Division I of the NCAA.  The university fully transitioned to Division I status in the National Collegiate Athletic Association at the beginning of the 2009–10 season. Vaughn Williams was hired in April 2011 as the university's third director of athletics. He had previously served for six and a half years as UConn's associate athletic director, where he was responsible for strategic planning, facility master planning, and policy and procedure improvement.

The Owls announced they would start a Division I Football Championship Subdivision football team on November 14, 2013. Their first football game was against the East Tennessee State Buccaneers in Johnson City, Tennessee on September 3, 2015. The Owls initially competed as a part of the Big South Conference because the ASUN did not sponsor football. Head Coach Brian Bohannon stated at the time that Kennesaw State had no interest in playing any games in exchange for guaranteed payments in the team's first few years. By the end of 2019 the Kennesaw Owls tallied a 48-15 total record from the beginning of the program, giving the team the record of most wins for a football program in its first 5 years.

The Owls play home games at Fifth Third Bank Stadium in Kennesaw. KSU announced in 2022 that they would be leaving the ASUN Conference for Conference USA in all sports starting in the 2024-2025 academic year. With the move the Owls Football program will move from NCAA Division I FCS to NCAA Division I FBS competition.

Traditions

School colors 
The official Kennesaw State University school colors are black and gold.

Mascot 
Kennesaw State University's mascot is Scrappy the Owl. The Kennesaw State Athletics Association unveiled their new Scrappy mascot on October 13, 2012, during their basketball season preview called Flight Night. The live owl named Sturgis was a Great Horned Owl and was KSU’s first-ever live mascot. He was with the university since his introduction at the second annual “Flight Night” in October 2013. KSU and Sturgis’ owner Daniel Walthers were unable to come to an agreement regarding a contract, and the decision to part ways was reached in 2019.

Notable people

Alumni 
 Nick Ayers, former Chief of Staff to the Vice President of the United States
 Michael Caldwell, Republican member of the Georgia House of Representatives
 Arturo Char, former Senator of Colombia and First Secretary of the Colombian Embassy in London
 Kristi DeMeester, horror writer
 Willie Harris, professional baseball player, World Series Champion with Chicago White Sox, 2005
 Dar'shun Kendrick, Democratic member of the Georgia House of Representatives
 Charles Lollar, businessman and politician
 Richard Lovelady, professional baseball player
 Masey McLain, movie actress
 Larry Nelson, professional golf player
 Kandice Pelletier, Miss New York 2005, appeared on CBS's The Amazing Race 10 (attended)
 Ty Pennington, host of ABC's Extreme Makeover: Home Edition and TLC's Trading Spaces (attended)
 Max Pentecost, first round pick in 2014 MLB Draft
 Bronson Rechsteiner, professional wrestler and American football player
 Nels S.D. Peterson, lawyer and jurist
 Mac Powell, lead singer of the contemporary Christian band "Third Day"
 Ali Shilatifard, molecular biologist
 Lauren Simmons, youngest female broker at the New York Stock Exchange
 Doug Stoner, Georgia State Senator
 James Wade, professional basketball player and coach
 Richard Woods, Georgia Superintendent of Schools

Professors and scholars 
Joe Bock, Director, School of Conflict Management
Farooq Kperogi, professor of journalism and emerging media
Rhubarb Jones, former radio disc jockey, professor of mass communications
 Jennifer Lewis Priestley, School of Data Science, author and professor, Architect of First Ph.D Program in Data Science
Gerónimo Lluberas, College of Nursing, international physician, humanitarian, musician
Melanie Sumner, novelist and writer
Britain J. Williams, computer science professor emeritus, national expert on election systems
Kerwin Swint, author and professor of political science, expert on elections, political campaigns, and political history

Demographics

Kennesaw State University CDP is a census-designated place (CDP) and the official name for an area covering the Kennesaw State University campus in Cobb County, Georgia. It does not include the Kennesaw State University campus in Marietta. It first appeared as a CDP in the 2020 Census with a population of 382.

2020 census

References

External links 

 
 Kennesaw State Athletics website

 
Educational institutions established in 1963
Public universities and colleges in Georgia (U.S. state)
Kennesaw, Georgia
Marietta, Georgia
Universities and colleges accredited by the Southern Association of Colleges and Schools
Education in Cobb County, Georgia
Buildings and structures in Cobb County, Georgia
Tourist attractions in Cobb County, Georgia
1963 establishments in Georgia (U.S. state)